Chavan or Chavhan is a Maratha clan found largely in Maharashtra, India, and neighbouring states.

Origin 

Chavan Maratha claims descent from Chauhan Rajputs from whom Prithviraj Chauhan last Hindu Emperor of Delhi belongs to. Alternately, there are claims that they are Somvanshi, a larger category to which Agnivansh belong.

Branches 
Aatle, Achar, Ankushrao, Ambirrao, Esapute, Pachpute, Satpute, Kabhandh, Kalbhor, Kanojiya, Karkre, Kisab, Kaspale, Kalbhar, Kapde, Karbharee, Kedar, Kharkhare, Kharpate, Khartope, Khandekar, Khamkar, Khulale, Gund, Dhagdh, Chandawle, Chudawala, Dang, Dafle, Dhawle, Dhakle, Hambirrao, Sardesai, Tirkhunde, Titway, Tibe, Tegle, Temkar, Topsule, Tablkar, Thorad, Dare, Desai, Dhahibe, Dalpate, Dusing, Dewge, Dhadam, Dhopte, Dhoran, Prabhudesai, Prabhu, Parthe, Parwarkar, Phalke, Phage, Bache, Warge, Bhandare, Bhaykar, Bhalsinh, Bhonwar, Bhoyar, Bhorrdar, Randiwe, Langthe, Lotankar, Majalkar, Wadkar, Sinab, Hawle, Dhipule, Takwe, Dagde, Dangle, Date, Dhadpade, Dhadote, Dhekre, Zambre, Ugale.

Notable people

Nobles
Udaji Chavan (1696-1745), Senapati to Sambhaji II of Kolhapur.

Politicians

 Ashok Chavan (born 1958), 21st Chief Minister of Maharashtra, India
 Harischandra Devram Chavan (born 1951), Indian politician and Lok Sabha member
 Madhukarrao Chavan, Indian politician and a Maharashtra Vidhan Sabha Deputy Speaker
 Prithviraj Chavan (born 1946), 22nd Chief Minister of Maharashtra, India
 Shankarrao Chavan, (1920–2004), Chief Minister of Maharashtra, India during 1975-1977 and 1986-1988
 Vandana Chavan (born 1963), Indian politician and Rajya Sabha member
 Yashwantrao Chavan (1913–1984), first Chief Minister of Maharashtra, India

Other

 Ajay Chavan (born 1957), Indian cricketer
 Ankeet Chavan (born 1985), Indian cricketer
 Pushkaraj Chavan, Indian cricketer
 Sulochana Chavan, Indian Marathi-language singer
 Usha Chavan (born 1955), Indian actress

References

Sources

Marathi

English

 
 
 
 

 

 

 
 Maharashtra State Gazetteers: Ahmadnagar, Maharashtra (India), Maharashtra (India). Gazetteers Dept.

Maratha clans
Surnames